Grant Clitsome (born April 14, 1985) is a Canadian former professional ice hockey defenceman who played for the Columbus Blue Jackets and the Winnipeg Jets of the National Hockey League (NHL) from 2008 to 2016.

Playing career
Clitsome was drafted in the ninth round, 271st overall, by the Columbus Blue Jackets in the 2004 NHL Entry Draft. He then committed to a four-year collegiate career with Clarkson University of the ECAC.

Clitsome made his NHL debut on March 2, 2010, providing two assists for the Blue Jackets and winning the game's third star in a 4-3 overtime loss to the Vancouver Canucks while on emergency call-up.  His first NHL goal was scored on March 27, 2010 against Dwayne Roloson of the New York Islanders.  On July 22, 2010, Grant re-signed as a restricted free agent with the Blue Jackets to a one-year contract.

On February 27, 2012, Clitsome was claimed off waivers by the Winnipeg Jets and later signed a three-year contract extension with the team on January 2, 2013. A serious injury in 2014 forced Clitsome to undergo back surgery in Los Angeles on Thursday, January 8, 2015.  Clitsome did not play again following the surgery, missing the remainder of the 2014-15 season and the entire 2015-16 season.  He announced his retirement from professional hockey on June 1, 2016.

Career statistics

Awards and honours

References

External links

1985 births
Living people
Canadian ice hockey defencemen
Clarkson Golden Knights men's ice hockey players
Columbus Blue Jackets draft picks
Columbus Blue Jackets players
Nepean Raiders players
Ice hockey people from Ottawa
Springfield Falcons players
Syracuse Crunch players
Winnipeg Jets players
AHCA Division I men's ice hockey All-Americans